Team Pedercini is an Italian motorcycle racing team competing in the Superbike World Championship using Kawasaki ZX-10R and in Supersport 300 World Championship with Kawasaki Ninja 400 motorcycles.

History
The team was founded in 1993 by Lucio Pedercini. Pedercini rode in the 500cc World Championship with a ROC-Yamaha until 1998, when he switched to World Superbike Championship. The team then extended its participation in the following years also to the Italian Championship and the FIM Superstock 1000 Championship. Pedercini raced with his team until 2006, when he retired from racing.  The team used Ducati motorbikes until 2008, when they started using Kawasaki machinery.

In 2014, the team competed in the World Superbike Championship with riders Alessandro Andreozzi and Luca Scassa. The also fielded a team in the FIM Superstock 1000 Cup consisting of Lorenzo Savadori, Balazs Nemeth, Romain Lanusse and Javier Alviz. In 2015, the team were chosen by Kawasaki to be their satellite team competing in the World Superbike Championship with Javier Alviz and David Salom riding Kawasaki Ninja ZX-10R motorcycles.

World Superbike

(key) (Races in bold indicate pole position; races in italics indicate fastest lap)

* Season still in progress.

References

External links
 Official website

Motorcycle racing teams
Superbike racing
Motorcycle racing teams established in 1993
1993 establishments in Italy